Mników may refer to the following places in Poland:
Mników, Lower Silesian Voivodeship (south-west Poland)
Mników, Lesser Poland Voivodeship (south Poland)